In geometry, a 10-orthoplex or 10-cross polytope, is a regular 10-polytope with 20 vertices, 180 edges, 960 triangle faces, 3360 octahedron cells, 8064 5-cells 4-faces, 13440 5-faces, 15360 6-faces, 11520 7-faces, 5120 8-faces, and 1024 9-faces.

It has two constructed forms, the first being regular with Schläfli symbol {38,4}, and the second with alternately labeled (checker-boarded) facets, with Schläfli symbol {37,31,1} or Coxeter symbol 711.

It is one of an infinite family of polytopes, called cross-polytopes or orthoplexes. The dual polytope is the 10-hypercube or 10-cube.

Alternate names
Decacross is derived from combining the family name cross polytope with deca for ten (dimensions) in Greek
 Chilliaicositetraronnon as a 1024-facetted 10-polytope (polyronnon).

Construction 
There are two Coxeter groups associated with the 10-orthoplex, one regular, dual of the 10-cube with the C10 or [4,38] symmetry group, and a lower symmetry with two copies of 9-simplex facets, alternating, with the D10 or [37,1,1] symmetry group.

Cartesian coordinates 
Cartesian coordinates for the vertices of a 10-orthoplex, centred at the origin are
 (±1,0,0,0,0,0,0,0,0,0), (0,±1,0,0,0,0,0,0,0,0), (0,0,±1,0,0,0,0,0,0,0), (0,0,0,±1,0,0,0,0,0,0), (0,0,0,0,±1,0,0,0,0,0), (0,0,0,0,0,±1,0,0,0,0), (0,0,0,0,0,0,±1,0,0,0), (0,0,0,0,0,0,0,±1,0,0), (0,0,0,0,0,0,0,0,±1,0), (0,0,0,0,0,0,0,0,0,±1)

Every vertex pair is connected by an edge, except opposites.

Images

References
 H.S.M. Coxeter: 
 H.S.M. Coxeter, Regular Polytopes, 3rd Edition, Dover New York, 1973 
 Kaleidoscopes: Selected Writings of H.S.M. Coxeter, edited by F. Arthur Sherk, Peter McMullen, Anthony C. Thompson, Asia Ivic Weiss, Wiley-Interscience Publication, 1995,  
 (Paper 22) H.S.M. Coxeter, Regular and Semi Regular Polytopes I, [Math. Zeit. 46 (1940) 380-407, MR 2,10]
 (Paper 23) H.S.M. Coxeter, Regular and Semi-Regular Polytopes II, [Math. Zeit. 188 (1985) 559-591]
 (Paper 24) H.S.M. Coxeter, Regular and Semi-Regular Polytopes III, [Math. Zeit. 200 (1988) 3-45]
 Norman Johnson Uniform Polytopes, Manuscript (1991)
 N.W. Johnson: The Theory of Uniform Polytopes and Honeycombs, Ph.D. (1966)

External links 
 
 Polytopes of Various Dimensions
 Multi-dimensional Glossary

10-polytopes